Social Hill is an unincorporated community in Hot Spring County, Arkansas, United States. The Ouachita River is one mile to the east of the community.

References

Unincorporated communities in Hot Spring County, Arkansas
Unincorporated communities in Arkansas